is a passenger railway station located in the city of Yasu, Shiga Prefecture, Japan, operated by the West Japan Railway Company (JR West).

Lines

Station layout
The station consists of one island platform serving one track (No. 1) and one island platform serving two tracks (Nos. 2 and 3). The ticket windows and gates are located in the building above the platforms. The station has a Midori no Madoguchi staffed ticket office.

Platforms

Adjacent Stations

History
Yasu Station opened on 16 June 1891 as a station for both passenger and freight operations on the Japanese Government Railway (JGR), which became the Japan National Railway (JNR) after World War II. Freight operations ceased on 15 March 1972. A new station building was completed in January 1973. The station became part of the West Japan Railway Company on 1 April 1987 due to the privatization and dissolution of the JNR.

Station numbering was introduced to the station in March 2018 with Yasu being assigned station number JR-A21.

Passenger statistics
In fiscal 2019, the station was used by an average of 15,313 passengers daily (boarding passengers only).

Surrounding area
Yasu City Hall
Yasu Hospital
Shiga Prefectural Yasu High School
 Yasu City Yasu Elementary School

See also
List of railway stations in Japan

References

External links

JR West official home page

Railway stations in Japan opened in 1891
Tōkaidō Main Line
Railway stations in Shiga Prefecture
Yasu, Shiga